Chakiwara  is a neighbourhood locality in Lyari, located in the Karachi South district of Karachi, Pakistan. The area gets its name from the Chakee, a community of Gujarati Muslims.

Chakiwara derives its name as the district is home mainly to the Chakee, and other Gujarati Muslims such as the Ghanchi, Chhipa and Kachchi. There are also small groups of Sindhis and Pakhtoons. The majority of people living in this area are Balochs.

References

External links 
 Lyari Town, Karachi website.

Neighbourhoods of Karachi
Lyari Town